Nine Lessons and Carols, also known as the Festival of Nine Lessons and Carols and Service of Nine Lessons and Carols, is a service of Christian worship traditionally celebrated on or near Christmas Eve. The story of the fall of humanity, the promise of the Messiah, and the birth of Jesus is told in nine short Bible readings or lessons from Genesis, the prophetic books and the Gospels, interspersed with the singing of Christmas carols, hymns and choir anthems.

History

Although the tradition of Nine Lessons and Carols is popularly associated with King's College, Cambridge, its origins are attributed to Truro Cathedral in Cornwall. Up to the late 19th century, the singing of Christmas carols was normally performed by singers visiting people's houses, and carols — generally considered to be secular in content — had been excluded from Christian worship. In the Victorian era, the rising popularity of hymnody encouraged church musicians to introduce carols into worship. An 1875 book of carols, Carols for Use in Church During Christmas and Epiphany by Richard Chope and Sabine Baring-Gould, was an influential publication. At around this time, the composer and organist John Stainer was compiling a collection, Christmas Carols New and Old, and during Christmas 1878 he introduced carols into the service of Choral Evensong at St Paul's Cathedral in London. Other cathedrals also began to adopt carols at Christmastide that year and the Royal Cornwall Gazette reported that the choir of Truro Cathedral would sing a service of carols at 10:00 pm on Christmas Eve:

Two years later, the Right Rev. Edward White Benson, at that time Bishop of Truro, conducted the first formal service of "Nine Lessons and Carols" on Christmas Eve (24 December) 1880. Benson, concerned at the excessive consumption of alcohol in Cornish pubs during the festive season, sought a means of attracting revellers out of the pubs and into church by offering a religious celebration of Christmas. The idea for a service consisting of Christmas music interspersed with Bible readings was proposed by the succentor of the cathedral, the Rev. George Walpole (who later became Bishop of Edinburgh). The cathedral — a Victorian gothic building — was still under construction, and services were being held in a temporary wooden structure which served as a pro-cathedral. The first Nine Lessons and Carols service took place there at 10:00 p.m. on Christmas Eve and was attended by over 400 people.

Benson's son, A. C. Benson, later recalled: 

Bishop Benson was appointed Archbishop of Canterbury in 1883, and the Nine Lessons service began to gain in popularity across the Church of England and the wider Anglican Communion, as well as Roman Catholic churches in England and Wales. The original liturgy has since been adapted and used by other churches all over the world, particularly in English-speaking countries. Lessons and Carols most often occur in Anglican churches. However, numerous Christian denominations have adopted the service, or a variation of it, as part of their Christmas celebrations. In the UK, the service has become the standard format for school carol services.

In 1916, a service of Nine Lessons and Carols was held at Brown University in Providence, Rhode Island; the institution celebrated the 100th anniversary of its Lessons and Carols in 2016.

Notably in 1918, the Rev. Eric Milner-White the new dean of King's College, Cambridge, introduced the service to the college chapel, taking advantage of the established choral tradition of the Choir of King's College, Cambridge. It proved highly successful, and began an annual tradition — albeit with some alterations to Benson's original format from 1919 onwards. The BBC began to broadcast the service on the radio from 1928 and on television from 1954, establishing Carols from King's as the most popular and widely recognised presentation of the service.

In North America, the Lessons and Carols tradition spread to other US and Canadian institutions. In 1928, organist and choirmaster Twining Lynes, introduced the service to Groton School in Groton, Massachusetts, after being inspired by services in England.

In Canada, the Festival of Nine Lessons and carols is done multilingually at Bishop's College School, Quebec, with the nine lessons read in nine languages or dialects.

In December 2013, Truro Cathedral staged a reconstruction of Bishop Benson's original 1880 Nine Lessons with Carols Service which was attended by a congregation of over 1,500 people.

Service at King's College, Cambridge

The first Festival of Nine Lessons and Carols at King's College, Cambridge, was held on Christmas Eve in 1918. During World War I the dean, Eric Milner-White, had served as army chaplain in the 7th Infantry Division and he was concerned that the distress of the "Great War" had hardened attitudes against religion. Taking advantage of the established choral tradition of the Choir of King's College, Cambridge, he introduced Benson's carol service to King's as a means of attracting people back to Christian worship. The first Nine Lessons service in King's College Chapel was held on Christmas Eve, 1918, directed by Arthur Henry Mann who was the organist from 1876 to 1929.

The King's College service was immensely successful, and the following year Milner-White made some changes to Benson's original format, notably introducing the tradition of opening the service with a solo treble singing "Once in Royal David's City". This was then followed by a bidding prayer penned by Milner-White himself, and re-ordering the lessons. The choir had 16 trebles as specified in statutes laid down by Henry VI, and until 1927 the men's voices were provided by choral scholars and lay clerks. Today, 14 undergraduates from the choir sing the men's parts.

The popularity of the service was established when the service began to be broadcast by the British Broadcasting Corporation in 1928, and, except for 1930, has been broadcast every year since. During the 1930s the service reached a worldwide audience when the BBC began broadcasting the service on its Overseas Service. Even throughout the Second World War, despite the stained glass having been removed from the chapel and the lack of heating, the broadcasts continued. For security reasons, the name "King's" was not mentioned during wartime broadcasts.

Nine Lessons and Carols from King's College was first televised by BBC Television in 1954, conducted by the director of music, Boris Ord.

Since the Second World War, it has been estimated that each year there are millions of listeners worldwide who listen to the service live on the BBC World Service. Domestically, the service is broadcast live on BBC Radio 4, and a recorded broadcast is made on Christmas Day on BBC Radio 3. In the US, a 1954 service was put into the National Recording Registry by the Library of Congress in 2008. The broadcast has been heard live on public radio stations affiliated with American Public Media since 1979, and most stations broadcast a repeat on Christmas Day. Since 1963, the service has been periodically filmed for television broadcast in the UK. Presently, each year a programme entitled Carols from King's is pre-recorded in early or mid-December then shown on Christmas Eve in the UK on BBC Two and BBC Four. The programme is weighted more heavily in favour of carols sung by the choir, with only seven readings in total, not all of which are from the Bible.

In 2020, during the COVID-19 pandemic, the service was conducted, for the first time, without a congregation. The service did not take place live, but instead a pre-recorded service produced by King's College was broadcast at the usual time. It was the first time since 1930 that the service had not been broadcast live.

Order of service
The format of the first Festival of Nine Lessons and Carols did not differ substantially from the one known at King's College, Cambridge today. The order of the lessons was revised in 1919, and since that time the service has always begun with the hymn "Once in Royal David's City". Today the first verse is sung unaccompanied by a solo boy chorister. To avoid putting him under undue stress, the chorister is not told that he will be singing the solo until immediately before the service is to begin.

The Nine Lessons, which are the same every year, are read by representatives of the college and of the City of Cambridge from the 1611 Authorized King James Version of the Bible. The singing is divided into "carols" which are sung by the choir and "hymns" sung by the choir and congregation. Some services have also included anthems between the carols and hymns, such as a performance of "E'en So, Lord Jesus, Quickly Come" in 2004.  From 1982, Director of Music Stephen Cleobury commissioned a new carol each year on behalf of the college for the choir. The carols vary from year to year, although some music is repeated. The service ends with the hymn "Hark! The Herald Angels Sing". The following is from the service in 2008.

Organ preludes
Processional Hymn: "Once in Royal David's City" – words by Cecil Frances Alexander; melody by Henry Gauntlett; harmonised by Henry Gauntlett and A. H. Mann; descant by Stephen Cleobury.
Bidding Prayer
Carol: "If Ye would Hear the Angels Sing" – words by D. Greenwell; music by P. Tranchell
First Lesson from Genesis 3: 8–19 (read by a chorister)
Carol: "Remember, O Thou Man" – words, 16th century; music by Thomas Ravenscroft
Carol: "Adam lay ybounden" – words, 15th century; music by Boris Ord
Second Lesson from Genesis 22: 15–18 (read by a choral scholar)
Carol: "Angels from the Realms of Glory" – words by James Montgomery; music, old French tune arranged by Philip S. Ledger
Carol: "In Dulci Jubilo" – words, 14th-century German; music by Hieronymus Praetorius
Third Lesson from Isaiah 9: 2; 6–7 (read by a representative of Cambridge churches)
Carol: "Nowell Sing We Now All and Some" – words and music medieval, edited by John Stevens
Hymn: "Unto Us is Born a Son" – words, 15th-century Latin, translated by G.R. Woodward; music from Piae Cantiones arranged by David V. Willcocks
[[File:William Blake - Songs of Innocence and Experience - The Lamb.jpg|thumb|200px|The fourth lesson employed John Tavener's choral arrangement "The Lamb" of William Blake's The Lamb from Blake's collection Songs of Innocence and of Experience. This image represents copy C, object 8 of that original poem, currently held by the Library of Congress. The poem was published during 1794 and hand painted by Blake and his wife.]]
Fourth Lesson from Isaiah 11: 1–3a; 4a; 6–9 (read by a representative of the City of Cambridge)
Carol: "The Lamb" – words by William Blake; music by John Tavener
Carol: "Lo, How a Rose E'er Blooming" – words, 15th-century German, translated by C. Winkworth; music by Philip S. Ledger
Fifth Lesson from the Gospel of Luke 1: 26–35; 38 (read by a representative of King's College's sister college at Eton)
Carol: "I Sing of a Maiden" – words, 15th century; music by Lennox Berkeley
Carol: "The Night when She First Gave Birth" ("Mary") – words by Bertolt Brecht, translated by Michael Hamburger; music by Dominic Muldowney
Sixth Lesson from Luke 2: 1; 3–7 (read by the Chaplain)
Carol: "Sweet Baby, Sleep! What Ails My Dear?" ("Wither's Rocking Hymn)" – words by George Wither; music by Ralph Vaughan Williams
Carol: "What Sweeter Music can We Bring" – words by Robert Herrick; music by John Rutter
Seventh Lesson from Luke 2: 8–16 (read by the Director of Music)
Carol: "Infant Holy, Infant Lowly" – words, Polish traditional, translated by Edith M.G. Reed; music arranged by Stephen Cleobury
Hymn: "God Rest You Merry, Gentlemen" – English traditional; arranged by David V. Willcocks
Eighth Lesson from the Gospel of Matthew 2: 1–12 (read by a fellow of the college)
Carol: "Illuminare Jerusalem" – words adapted from the Bannatyne manuscript in John and Winifred MacQueen, A Choice of Scottish Verse, 1470–1570'' (1972); music by Judith Weir
Carol: "Glory, Alleluia to the Christ Child" – words, 17th century; music by A. BullardNinth Lesson from the Gospel of John 1: 1–14''' (read by the Provost of the college)
Hymn: "O Come, All Ye Faithful" ("Adeste Fideles") – words, 18th-century Latin, translated by Frederick Oakeley; melody by John Francis Wade, arranged by Stephen Cleobury
Collect and Blessing
Hymn: "Hark! The Herald Angels Sing" – words by Charles Wesley and George Whitefield; music by Felix Mendelssohn; descant by Stephen Cleobury
Organ Voluntaries: "In Dulci Jubilo" (BWV 729) by Johann Sebastian Bach, "Dieu Parmi Nous" by Olivier Messiaen
Organ Postlude

Commissioned carols and organ postludes

Attendance at the service
The Festival of Nine Lessons and Carols held on Christmas Eve at King's College Chapel is open to the general public. The service is very popular, and some people start queuing the night before as demand for seats always exceeds the number available.

See also

Anglican church music
List of carols at the Nine Lessons and Carols, King's College Chapel
100 Years of Nine Lessons and Carols

References

Citations

Sources

Further reading

.
.

External links

King's College Chapel's webpage about the service
Detailed order of service for 2009

Anglican liturgy
Christmas carols
Christmas in England
Nativity of Jesus in worship and liturgy